EP1 is the debut studio EP from the American rock group dollys.

Content
The six-track EP was self-released by dollys, on November 9, 2013. It was recorded between November 2012 and June 2013 at Lake House in Asbury Park, New Jersey, First Class Recording in Jackson, New Jersey, and The Headroom in Philadelphia, Pennsylvania. Engineering and production are by Erik Kase Romero, with additional engineering by Tim Pannella, and mastering by Tom Ruff at Asbury Media. Romero says of the home recording process, "it allowed us to have a very cosmopolitan palette of sounds and textures on the record [and] gave us the luxury of experimenting with different gear and taking our time to get the sounds we wanted." The album is compared to the music of That Dog.

The record release party was held at the Court Tavern in New Brunswick, New Jersey, on November 9, with support from Black Wine, Deal Casino and Long Beard.

Reception
A review from Under the Radar says EP1 is "top tier indie pop", adding that "the intricate interplay between vocalists, playing off each other and teasing blissful melodies from the ether, is something of a much more seasoned group." Speak into My Good Eye editor Chris Rotolo describes the song "Swim" as "a collage of instrumental swells, including a familiar series of rounded fret-play that recalls a Green Paper staple titled 'The Waltz', and spans the soundscape from elaborate to minimalist."

Track listing

Personnel
Erik Kase Romero – bass and vocals
Jeff Lane – guitar, keys and vocals
Michael Mendonez – guitar
Natalie Newbold – drums and vocals

References

Citations

Bibliography

External links

2013 EPs
Dollys albums
Indie pop EPs